The Police Association Victoria (TPAV) is the union organisation representing about 18,000 members of the Victoria Police. The alliance is affiliated with the Police Federation of Australia, representing over 60,000 Australian Police Officers.

History
The (former) Police Association was formed in 1917 arising from low wages and poor working conditions being endured by Victorian police officers at the time. Police had a long-standing grievance regarding their pension scheme abandoned by the Victorian Government in 1902.

After the 1923 Victorian Police strike, which the organisation never sanctioned, the Police Pensions Act 1923 recognized the organisation as the one employee body with which the State Government would deal on police welfare and efficiency matters. A substantial pay rise and improved working conditions resulted from the Act, however it also made it illegal for members of the force to join a 'political or industrial organisation', and it threatened a twelve-month prison sentence for any member who withheld his services or caused disaffection.

The secretary of the association between 2014 and 2016 was Ron Iddles.

Enterprise Bargaining Agreement
On 15 February 2016, Victoria Police members voted for the 2016 – 2019 Enterprise Bargain Agreement. On 4 March 2016, the outcome of the vote was announced but the new EB took effect starting on 1 December 2015. Under the new EB, Victoria Police officers will receive increased penalty rates for weekend work, added unsociable and intrusive to weekend work, increased pay for prosecutors and a number of other benefits and entitlements. The new EB did not include the ranks of Commanders and above.

On 2016 – 2019 EB, Victoria Police officers were offered 2.5% increase per year for 4 years starting on 1 December 2015. At first, the new proposed agreement was strongly opposed by The Police Association as, in reality, represented only 0.3% increase after inflation. However, in December 2015, The Police Association changed their position and supported the new EB.

References

Trade unions in Victoria (Australia)
Law enforcement in Victoria (Australia)
1917 establishments in Australia
Police unions
Trade unions established in 1917